The Victorian Centenary Grand Prix was a motor race staged at the Phillip Island circuit in Victoria, Australia on Saturday, 27 October 1934. The 230 mile race, which was organised by the Australian Racing Drivers Club, was contested on a handicap basis. The race was the richest and the longest that had been held in the state of Victoria to that time, and was the first road race in Australia to be open to "catalogued racing and sports cars of all powers". Of the 22 starters, eight finished within the limit of 25 minutes after the winner. The race was won by Mick Smith, competing under the name “Gardner”, and driving a Ford V8 Roadster.

The Grand Prix was an official event on the centenary program commemorating Edward Henty’s 1834 settlement at Portland, which led to the founding of the state of Victoria.

Results

Note: Non-finishers have been listed in starting order, due to lack of information regarding laps completed.

 Total race distance: 35 laps, 230 miles (370 km)
 Limit starter: Ted McLean 
 Scratch starter: Ces Warren 
 Winner's race time: 3:07:56 
 Fastest time: "Gardner" (Mick Smith)  
 Fastest lap: Ces Warren, 4:39 (84.74 mph) 
 Teams prize: Lane's Motors

References

Victorian Centenary Grand Prix
Motorsport at Phillip Island